Ingrid Kamateneti Turinawe (born 23 November 1973), commonly known as Ingrid Turinawe, is a female politician who serves as the Chairperson of the Women's League in the opposition Forum for Democratic Change (FDC) political party in Uganda. She also serves as the National Political Mobilizer for the FDC political party.

Background and education
She was born Ingrid Kamateneti, on 23 November 1973 to Jane Bakesiga and Stanley Bakwatilenda (died 1982), in Kashojwa Village, Rugyeyo sub-county, in present-day Kanungu District, before it was split from Rukungiri District. She was the fourth-born of her mother's nine children, five boys and four girls.

She attended "Rugyeyo Primary School" for he elementary schooling and she studied at "Kinyasano Girls High School" for both her O-Level and A-Level education. Later, she obtained a Diploma in Education from the National Teachers' College, Kabale, in Kabale town. Still later, she graduated from Nkumba University with a Bachelor of Public Administration and Management degree.

Career
During her long vacation after high school in 1992, Ingrid married Jackson Turinawe, a successful businessman in Rukungiri town. After her diploma studies in Kabale, Ingrid taught for one year and then joined her husband in business, helping to run their pharmacy in Rukungiri town.  In 1998, she was elected to the Rukungiri District Council, representing Buhunga sub-county and Ruhinda sub-county.

In 2001, she was re-elected to the district council. In 2003, Kanungu District was split off Rukungiri District. One year later, Ingrid Turinawe became Speaker of Rukungiri District, when the former speaker, George Owakiroru, was arrested for alleged terrorist activity. She served in that role until 2006. She became a founding member of the FDC political party in 2005.

In 2005, Ingrid separated from Jackson Turinawe, her husband of 13 years, but did not get a formal divorce. She relocated to Kampala, the capital and largest city in Uganda. In 2006, she contested the Rukungiri District Women's Constituency parliamentary seat, and again in 2011, losing both times.

Controversies
On 20 April 2012, Ingrid was driving to Nansana, a suburb of Kampala, to attend a political rally, when police intercepted her and a scuffle ensued, during which, a policeman forcefully grabbed her left breast. She sued the Uganda Police Force and Uganda Attorney General, for pain, suffering and general embarrassment, demanding USh560 million (approx. US$160,000), as compensatory damages. The Ugandan government publicly apologized to her and the case was settled out of court.

In February 2017, Ingrid contested one of the seats to the East African Legislative Assembly, which convenes in Arusha, Tanzania. The legislators to that body are elected by the respective parliaments of the member states of the East African Community. She encountered a very hostile reception in the parliamentary chamber, when she went to declare her candidacy, due to her frosty relationships with the Ugandan MPs, the majority of whom belong to the ruling National Resistance Movement political party. When the actual voting took place on 28 February 2017, she received a paltry 25 votes out of a possible maximum of 398 votes.

Other considerations
Ingrid Turinawe and her estranged husband Jackson Turinawe are the parents of five children, three girls and two boys. In March 2017, The Ugandan Magazine listed Ingrid Turinawe among the "10 Most Powerful Women in Ugandan Politics in 2017.

See also
Winnie Kiiza
Angelline Osegge
Nabilah Naggayi Sempala
Anna Ebaju Adeke

References

External links
Turinawe to challenge EALA poll results over mistreatment

1973 births
Living people
People from Rukungiri District
People from Western Region, Uganda
Nkumba University alumni
Forum for Democratic Change politicians
21st-century Ugandan women politicians
21st-century Ugandan politicians